Harold Lord Varney (1893–1984) was an American author.

Varney was an editor at The Awakener and The American Mercury. He was a member of the IWW, of which he wrote the account Revolt. Later he moved in the direction of fascism.

After the war he was a contributor to American Opinion and headed a pro-Panama committee.

Varney was friends with Joseph P. Kamp, who was his executive editor for The Awakener.

1893 births
1984 deaths
American magazine editors
Industrial Workers of the World members
Old Right (United States)
20th-century American non-fiction writers
American fascists